Ersta Sköndal Bräcke University College is a private Swedish institution for higher education and research. The university college has departments for education in nursing, social work, church music, theology and psychotherapy as well as research within the field of social science, welfare rights, health care science and ethics, palliative care, diaconal research, organizational and work-life ethics and psychotherapy research.

The aims of the research programme are in line with the university college's diaconal history. In 1851, the first nurse training course in Sweden was launched by Marie Cederschiöld under the auspices of Ersta diakoni. The first socially oriented programme at national level began at the turn of the last century in the form of diaconal training at the Stora Sköndal Foundation.

Today Ersta Sköndal Bräcke University College is owned by Ersta diakoni, Stora Sköndal Foundation and Bräcke diakoni, divided into three campuses located in Södermalm, Stockholm, Stora Sköndal, south of Stockholm and Hisingen, Gothenburg.

The historical background has resulted in human health, welfare, and vulnerability being the focus of study and explains how research fields have developed and given the university its specific profile.

Departments 
 Department of diaconal studies, church music and theology
 Department of social sciences
 Department of health care sciences (including S:t Lukas educational institute and Palliative research centre)
 Institute for commissioned education
 Institute for organisational and work-life ethics
 Library

References

External links 
  for Ersta Sköndal Bräcke University College 
 Ersta Sköndal Bräcke University College 

Education in Stockholm